Citrus glauca, commonly known as the desert lime, is a thorny shrub or small tree native to Queensland, New South Wales, and South Australia. The 1889 book The Useful Native Plants of Australia records common names native kumquat and desert lemon.

Taxonomy

Under the Swingle system, the desert lime was classified in the genus Eremocitrus, a close relative of the genus Citrus. More recent taxonomy considers all the Australian limes to be included in the genus Citrus, and most authorities treat the desert lime this way. Citrus glauca is one of the most resilient Citrus species, and is comparatively heat, drought, and cold tolerant. Hence the species is potentially important for Citrus breeding programs, and readily hybridises with many common Citrus species.

Description
It is cold, heat, drought and salinity tolerant and thought evergreen. If the rains should fail it will shed its leaves and live off the green bark on the plant branches. It will set fruit almost immediately after flowering and is the earliest citrus to do so. Fruit is small and variable and depends on current climatic conditions and genetic make-up. Thorns appear on low-growing branches to prevent grazing by rabbits, kangaroos, cattle etc. but cease on  branches above the grazing level. The fruit is globular, and about half-an-inch in diameter. The limes have an intense piquant flavour, and good rainfall years produce an abundance of fruit.

Economic uses

The desert lime fruit is a highly prized bushfood. Traditionally, it is wild-harvested from surviving bushland areas, where it is relatively common. However, C. glauca has also been extensively cleared from some areas due to the ongoing conversion of the wild bush into agricultural fields. The fruit are used in a range of products, including marmalades, beverages, and succade. It has a strong lime-like flavour.

The fruit is beginning to be domesticated. Commercial cultivation of this fruit is beginning to reduce the reliance on wild-harvested product.

Taxonomy, cultivars, and hybrids
{{clade| style=font-size:100%;line-height:100%
|label1=Australian limes
|1={{clade
|label1=former Eremocitrus
  |1=Citrus glauca
  |label2=former Microcitrus
  |2={{clade
     |1=Citrus warburgiana
     |2={{clade
        |1=        |2=
        |3=Citrus australis}} }} }} }}

Australian outback lime
The Australian Outback lime was selected by CSIRO scientists from the regular desert lime. It is characterised by its upright habit, relatively large, flavoursome fruit, high yield, uniform ripening time, lack of thorns, and suitability for mechanical harvesting. The Australian Outback lime was cultivated at the former CSIRO Plant Industry site at Merbein, Victoria by Steve Sykes.

Hybrids

The eremolemon is thought to be a natural true-breeding hybrid between Citrus glauca and Citrus meyeri.Citrus plants hybridise readily, other hybrids include eremoranges, eremoradias (hybrid with a sour orange) and citrangeremos (hybrid with a citrange).

Notes

References
 Bruneteau, Jean-Paul, Tukka, Real Australian Food, .
 Cherikoff, Vic, The Dining Downunder Cookbook'', .

External links

Australian cuisine
Bushfood
glauca
Crops originating from Australia
Desert fruits
Drought-tolerant trees
Flora of New South Wales
Flora of Queensland
Flora of South Australia
Sapindales of Australia
Trees of Australia
glauca